George Guthrie  (born 1842, in Newcastle) moved away from the town eastwards towards the coast, and worked as a blacksmith in Wallsend and Sunderland.

He came to the attention of Joe Wilson, the great Music Hall performer, who said that many of Guthrie’s songs had considerable merit, and were much to be admired.

One of his songs "Heh ye seen wor Cuddy" sung to the tune of  "The King of the Cannibal Islands" appears on page 13 of J. W. Swanston’s The Tyneside Songster and page 518 of Thomas Allan’s illustrated edition of Tyneside Songs and Readings.

See also 
Geordie dialect words
Thomas Allan
Allan's Illustrated Edition of Tyneside Songs and Readings
The Tyneside Songster by J W Swanston
J. W. Swanston

References

External links
 FARNE - Folk Archive – enter Guthrie George
Allan’s Illustrated Edition of Tyneside songs and readings

Geordie songwriters

English songwriters
People from Newcastle upon Tyne (district)
Musicians from Tyne and Wear
1842 births
20th-century deaths